Željko Jovanović (born 26 November 1965) is a Croatian politician and physician who served as Minister of Science, Education and Sports from 2011 until 2014. He is a member of the center-left Social Democratic Party of Croatia.

Early life
Željko Jovanović, an ethnic Serb, was born on November 26, 1965 in Rijeka. Jovanović spent his early childhood in Grobnik, Podhum and Svilno with his parents Niko and Petra. He enrolled into elementary school after moving to Turnić. His brother Slobodan was born in this period. Jovanović's class was the only group in generation which studied Russian as the foreign language in the school. As a child, Jovanović was interested in sports and movies. He particularly liked Otpisani, Gustav and Bruce Lee. In 1978 he participated in "Šamac Sarajevo 78" youth work action.

Education
Jovanović graduated medicine from the School of Medicine of the University of Rijeka, and gained master's degree's in the field of biomedical sciences (Rijeka School of Medicine, 1995) and in the field of marketing management (Rijeka Faculty of Economics, 2005). He also holds doctorate in internal medicine. During his studies Jovanović was involved in student politics and he was president of the Student Union at the School of Medicine, president of the Student Board of the University of Rijeka and the First Student Vice-Rector. He completed further professional development at the London Business School and INSEAD.

Politics
Since 23 December 2011 he has held the post of Minister of Science, Education and Sports in the centre-left government of Zoran Milanović. He received his doctorate in biomedical science and his master's degree in economics at the University of Rijeka in 2005.

On 13 January 2012, Antun Vrdoljak threatened to sue if Jovanović did not apologize for accusing Vrdoljak, in his capacity as member of the International Olympic Committee, of "selling the candidacy of the City of Rijeka for hosting the Mediterranean games."

Personal life
Jovanović was a member of the Croatian Army during the Croatian War of Independence. He is married and has one son.

References

1965 births
Living people
Politicians from Rijeka
Serbs of Croatia
University of Rijeka alumni
Social Democratic Party of Croatia politicians
Government ministers of Croatia
Representatives in the modern Croatian Parliament
Alumni of London Business School
INSEAD alumni
Croatian physicians